María del Rocío Jaspeado Villanueva (born 20 May 1967) is a Mexican politician affiliated with the National Action Party. As of 2014 she served as Deputy of the LIX Legislature of the Mexican Congress as a plurinominal representative.

References

1967 births
Living people
Politicians from the State of Mexico
Women members of the Chamber of Deputies (Mexico)
Members of the Chamber of Deputies (Mexico)
National Action Party (Mexico) politicians
Autonomous University of Mexico State alumni
University of Salamanca alumni
21st-century Mexican politicians
21st-century Mexican women politicians
Deputies of the LIX Legislature of Mexico